The Tracts for the Times were a series of 90 theological publications, varying in length from a few pages to book-length, produced by members of the English Oxford Movement, an Anglo-Catholic revival group, from 1833 to 1841. There were about a dozen authors, including Oxford Movement leaders John Keble, John Henry Newman and Edward Bouverie Pusey, with Newman taking the initiative in the series, and making the largest contribution. With the wide distribution associated with the tract form, and a price in pennies, the Tracts succeeded in drawing attention to the views of the Oxford Movement on points of doctrine, but also to its overall approach, to the extent that Tractarian became a synonym for supporter of the movement.

Background
On 14 July 1833, Keble preached at St Mary's an assize sermon on "National Apostasy", which Newman afterwards regarded as the inauguration of the Oxford Movement. In the words of Richard William Church, it was "Keble who inspired, Froude who gave the impetus, and Newman who took up the work"; but the first organisation of it was due to Hugh James Rose, editor of the British Magazine, who has been styled "the Cambridge originator of the Oxford Movement". Rose met Oxford Movement figures on a visit to Oxford looking for magazine contributors, and it was in his rectory house at Hadleigh, Suffolk, that a meeting of High Church clergy was held over 25–26 July (Newman was not present, but Hurrell Froude, Arthur Philip Perceval, and William Palmer had gone to visit Rose), at which it was resolved to fight for "the apostolical succession and the integrity of the Prayer Book."

Publication
Many of the tracts were labelled, indicating their intended audience: Ad Clerum (to the clergy), Ad Populum (to the people), or Ad Scholas (to scholars). The first 20 tracts appeared in 1833, with 30 more in 1834. After that the pace slowed, but the later contributions were more substantive on doctrinal matters. Initially these publications were anonymous, pseudonymous, or reprints from theologians of previous centuries. The authorship details of the tracts were recovered by later scholars of the Oxford Movement, with some tentative accounts of drafting. Through Francis Rivington, the tracts were published by the Rivington house in London, and were simultaneously published by J H Parker in Oxford.

Opposition
The Tracts also provoked a secondary literature from opponents. Significant replies came from evangelicals, including that of William Goode in Tract XC Historically Refuted (1845) and Isaac Taylor. The term "Tractarian" applied to followers of Keble, Pusey and Newman (the Oxford Movement) was used by 1839, in sermons by Christopher Benson.

The series was brought to an end by the intervention of Richard Bagot, Bishop of Oxford, not unsympathetic to the Tractarians, after the appearance of Newman's Tract 90, which suggested a heterodox reading of the Thirty-Nine Articles of the Church of England, and caused controversy in the University.

Literature
William Palmer in 1843 published A Narrative of Events Connected with the Publication of the Tracts for the Times, dedicated to Bagot. In the Preface he is concerned with arguing against the point of view that the Tracts were an attempt to introduce Roman Catholic beliefs; to place the Tracts in the context set up by the 1833 formation of the Association of Friends of the Church (set up by Hugh James Rose, Hurrell Froude and Palmer himself) that was the initial step in the Oxford Movement; and to distance his views from the editorial line of the British Critic. This work then provoked a major statement of his position by William George Ward.

Table of the Tracts

Further publications
Two other ambitious projects of the Oxford Movement as a whole were conceived and launched in the same period: the Library of Anglo-Catholic Theology that gave extensive republication to the works of the Caroline Divines and others who were cited in the Tracts; and the Library of the Fathers. Isaac Williams with William John Copeland edited Plain Sermons by Contributors to the Tracts for the Times, in ten volumes, appearing from 1839 to 1848.

Notes

References
Listing of the Tracts taken from the Appendix in Henry Parry Liddon, Life of Edward Bouverie Pusey. Vol. III (1894).
Richard Mammana (editor), Tracts for the Times by Members of the University of Oxford (Littlemore Press, 2000), ISBN 9780970036209

External links
The Tractarian Critique of the Evangelical Church Invisible: Tracts 2, 11, 20 and 47 in Historical Context (PDF)
Tracts for the Times from Project Canterbury

Anglo-Catholicism
Christianity in Oxford
History of the Church of England
1830s in Christianity
Series of non-fiction books
Christian theology books